The 2009 Formula Renault 2.0 Northern European Cup was the fourth Formula Renault 2.0 Northern European Cup season. The season began at Zandvoort on 12 April and finished on 4 October at Spa, after sixteen races.

Motopark Academy driver António Félix da Costa won the NEC championship title, having won nine races during the season, bringing the team their fourth successive drivers' championship title. His team-mates, Danish drivers Kevin Magnussen and Marco Sørensen, completed the top three, for the team's third consecutive championship title.

Drivers and teams

Race calendar and results

Standings
Points system: 30, 24, 20, 17, 16, 15, 14, 13, 12, 11, 10, 9, 8, 7, 6, 5, 4, 3, 2, 1 for 20th. Only the best 14 results counted towards the final standings.

References

External links
 Official website of the Formula Renault 2.0 NEC championship

NEC
Formula Renault 2.0 NEC
Formula Renault 2.0 NEC
Renault NEC